St. Catherine of Siena Academy is a private Roman Catholic girls' high school in Wixom, Michigan, United States.

External links
 School Website

Catholic secondary schools in Michigan
Roman Catholic Archdiocese of Detroit
2006 establishments in Michigan
High schools in Oakland County, Michigan
Educational institutions established in 2006
Girls' schools in Michigan